Edward Christopher Williams (born 20 July 1995) is an English professional footballer.

Club career
Born in Cheltenham, Williams spent his early career with Cheltenham Town, Gloucester City and Kidderminster Harriers, before signing for Doncaster Rovers in August 2020. He was made available by Doncaster manager Richie Wellens in July 2021, but he returned to the first-team squad in December 2021 by caretaker manager Gary McSheffrey. He signed on loan for MLS Next Pro club Rochester New York FC in February 2022. Following Doncaster's relegation to League Two, Williams was released by the club at the end of the 2021–22 season.

International career
He has also played for the England C national team.

References

External links

1995 births
Living people
English footballers
Association football midfielders
Cheltenham Town F.C. players
Gloucester City A.F.C. players
Kidderminster Harriers F.C. players
Doncaster Rovers F.C. players
Rochester New York FC players
English Football League players
National League (English football) players
English expatriate footballers
English expatriates in the United States
Expatriate soccer players in the United States
MLS Next Pro players